Chicago Overcoat is a 2009 American gangster film. The script was written by Brian Caunter, John W. Bosher, Josh Staman, and Andrew Alex Dowd; Caunter also directed. The production filmed in Chicago and wrapped principal photography November 29, 2007. Chicago Overcoat had its world premiere at the 45th Chicago International Film Festival on Saturday, October 10, 2009, with three sold out screenings and was brought back for an encore screening after being voted into the "Best of the Fest". The film went on to win "Best Dramatic Feature" at the 8th Garden State Film Festival, and "Best Cinematography" at the 7th Midwest Independent Film Festival.

"Chicago Overcoat" is a Prohibition era slang term meaning "coffin" or cement shoes.

Plot
Lou Marazano was once a feared hit man, but his reputation has dimmed significantly twenty years after his retirement. Unable to help his daughter financially after her ex-husband fails to pay child support, he asks the current local mob boss, Lorenzo Galante, for work. Though reluctant to give him the job, Galante sends him to kill several witnesses who will testify against D'Agostino, the previous mob boss. After Marazano sends flowers to the widow of one of the men he kills, Ralph Maloney, a veteran cop, reopens a case that involved a string of murders from the early 1990s. Though discouraged from investigating, Maloney and his partner, Elliot Walsh stake out the second target. Picked up at the scene of the crime, Marazano does not talk, and the police are forced to set him free when his girlfriend and her neighbors provide an alibi.

Worried that Marazano may talk in order to avoid jail time, Galante orders him killed. Marazano stays a step ahead of his former friends, and he is able to kill the crew sent to assassinate him. Knowing that he must also kill Galante, Marazano heads to Galante's bar, where Galante threatens Marazano's family. Unmoved by the threats, Marazano kills Galante and offers his gold watch to an elderly man. When the elderly man is taken in by the police as a potential witness, they spot the distinctive watch and realize that they have enough evidence to arrest Marazano. Meanwhile, Marazano collects the money from his job and receives his final target: the police captain. Meanwhile, Walsh takes over the investigation once Maloney became frustrated with the department's red tape.

When their captain says that he has important information to share, Walsh and Maloney, who has returned to active duty despite his cynicism, meet him in private at a parking lot.  Unknown to the others, Marazano tails the cops. Revealing that he is corrupt, the captain shoots both his subordinates. Before the captain can finish off either man, Marazano kills him. As Marazano turns to leave, Maloney And Walsh attempt to stop him.  In the ensuing gunfight, Maloney accidentally kills Walsh. Enraged, he chases after Marazano, whom he blames for Walsh's death. When Maloney confronts him, Marazano kills him. At his daughter's house, Marazano gives her all the money and urges her to leave the city, which he also plans to do.

Cast
 Frank Vincent as Lou Marazano
 Kathrine Narducci as Lorraine Lionello
 Mike Starr as Lorenzo Galante
 Stacy Keach as Ray Berkowski
 Armand Assante as Stefano D'Agostino
 Danny Goldring  as Ralph Maloney
 Tim Gamble as Harold Greene
 Martin Shannon as Sammy Delano
 Barret Walz as Elliot Walsh
 Gina D'Ercoli as Angela Casso
 Robert Gerdisch as Michael Casso
 Rick Plastina as Angelo Perelli
 Mark Vallarta as Joey Casso
 Jack Bronis  as Joe Barbone
 Michael Guido  as Frank Salerno
 Ray Toler  as Philip Rossi
 Ulises Acosta  as Rodrigo

Reception
Alissa Simon of Variety wrote that the film "musters mob-film cliches with verve".  Reece Pendleton of the Chicago Reader wrote, "Despite the stock characters and well-trod material, this is an engaging tale, enhanced considerably by Vincent's perfect mix of vulnerability and steely resolve."  Bill Gibron of DVD Verdict called it "a nicely nuanced crime story".

References

External links
 

2009 films
2000s crime films
American gangster films
American independent films
Films set in Chicago
Films shot in Chicago
Films about the American Mafia
Films about the Chicago Outfit
Cultural depictions of the Mafia
2000s English-language films
2000s American films
2009 independent films